George Wills Comstock (January 7, 1915 – July 15, 2007) was a public health physician, epidemiologist, and educator. He was known for significant contributions to public health, specifically in the fields of micronutrient deficiencies, tuberculosis, and cardiovascular disease. He served as the editor-in-chief for the American Journal of Epidemiology.

Early life
Born in Niagara Falls, New York, on January 7, 1915, George W. Comstock was the son of metallurgical engineer George Frederick Comstock and Ella Gardner Wills Comstock. He graduated from Antioch College in 1937 with honors in biology and chemistry, originally planning on becoming a metallurgist. He ultimately decided to pursue medicine and graduated from Harvard Medical School with a doctor of medicine in 1941.

Career

Public Health Service
Comstock joined the U.S. Public Health Service in 1942 and served as a captain for 21 years. In this role, he ran the first trials of the BCG vaccine for tuberculosis in Georgia and Alabama (1947–1951), the findings of which were crucial to the decision not to implement this vaccine in the United States. It was also one of the first, if not the first, use of a cluster-randomized study design.

Public health education
He received a Master of Public Health from the University of Michigan School of Public Health (1951) and Doctorate of Public Health in Epidemiology from Johns Hopkins (1956). He subsequently joined the faculty at the Johns Hopkins University Bloomberg School of Public Health and taught there for more than 50 years.

Tuberculosis treatment research
In 1957, he led research in Bethel, Alaska, estimating the high burden of tuberculosis and demonstrating the drug isoniazid's effectiveness in preventing the disease.

Community-based research
In 1962, Comstock founded the Johns Hopkins Training Center for Public Health Research and Prevention in Hagerstown, Maryland. During this time, together with Abraham Lilienfeld, he came up with the pioneering idea of using biologic samples in cohort studies.  For the next 42 years, Comstock oversaw community-based research studies on numerous diseases including cancer and heart disease, including the Cardiovascular Health Study (CHS), the Campaign Against Cancer and Stroke (CLUE I), the Campaign Against Cancer and Heart Disease (CLUE II), and the Atherosclerosis Risk in Communities (ARIC) study. He also may have conducted, the first case-cohort study reported in the literature, four decades ago, dealing with the relationships of maternal smoking to risks of neonatal and post-neonatal death.

American Journal of Epidemiology
Comstock also served as editor-in-chief of the American Journal of Epidemiology (AJE) from 1979 to 1988. He was subsequently the editor-in-chief, emeritus, from 1991 to 2007. Volume 167, issue 7 of AJE was dedicated entirely to Comstock following his death.

Research themes
In his 2006 curriculum vitae, Comstock summarized his research as follows:

Awards and contributions
Comstock authored hundreds of scientific papers and received numerous awards, including the John Snow Award from the American Public Health Association, the Edward Livingston Trudeau Medal from the American Thoracic Society, the Maxwell Finland Award for Scientific Achievement from the National Foundation for Infectious Diseases and the National Heart, Lung and Blood Institute's Career Research Award.

His work influenced generations of students, many of whom now hold public health leadership positions throughout the world. His contributions to the science of epidemiology were notable. For example, Comstock often mentioned  "compensating bias" and the difference between the external validity of a measure of frequency and that of a measure of association, years before this concept was reported in the literature. He was also responsible for the notion that case-control studies test effectiveness, not efficacy, of interventions.

In 2005, the Hopkins center in Hagerstown, Maryland, was renamed The George W. Comstock Center for Public Health Research and Prevention.

George Comstock frequently quoted these words from Horace Mann's 1859 commencement speech at Antioch College:

This struck him as the main purpose of living; as Comstock said,

References

Further reading
 "Lucky all my life": a documentary about G.W. Comstock 

American public health doctors
1915 births
2007 deaths
People from Niagara Falls, New York
University of Michigan School of Public Health alumni
Antioch College alumni
Harvard Medical School alumni
Johns Hopkins Bloomberg School of Public Health alumni
Johns Hopkins Bloomberg School of Public Health